Gejang (게장) or gejeot (게젓) is a variety of jeotgal, salted fermented seafood in Korean cuisine, which is made by marinating fresh raw crabs either in ganjang (soy sauce) or in a sauce based on chili pepper powder. The term consists of the two words; ge, meaning "a crab", and jang which means "condiment" in Korean. Although gejang originally referred only to crabs marinated in soy sauce, it has begun to be called ganjang-gejang (간장게장) these days to differentiate it from yangnyeom-gejang (양념게장). The latter is a relatively new dish that emerged since the restaurant industry began to thrive in South Korea. "Yangnyeom" literally means "seasoning" or "seasoned" in Korean but refers to the spicy sauce made with chili pepper powder.

Gyeongsang, Jeolla, and Jeju Island are famous for their own characteristic gejang. It is a representative speciality of Yeosu in South Jeolla Province, and a traditional Jeolla cuisine dish. 

According to a poll of tourists to Korea, gejang is difficult to eat because the dish is too hot and salty.

A similar dish (生腌蟹) exists in China.

Historical records
Historical records on gejang can be found in books such as Sallim gyeongje (lit. "Farm Management"), Gyuhap chongseo (lit. "Women's Encyclopedia"), Jubangmun (주방문, 酒方文, lit. "Book of Making Alcoholic beverage"), Siui jeonseo (lit. "Complete Collection of Corrections and Discussions") and others written during the Joseon Dynasty of Korea (1392 - 1910). According to Sallim gyeongje written around the end of the 17th century, making gejang is referred to as "johaebeop" (조해법, 糟蟹法), which means "a way of marinating crabs in sediments of liquor". With the method, crabs are marinated in a mixture of jaegang (재강, sediments of liquor), salt, and an alcoholic beverage. In general, gejang spoils if preserved for a long time; however, the gejang made by the johaebeop can be even eaten until the next spring. In addition, the book records various ways of making gejang such as juhaebeop (酒蟹法, made with alcoholic beverage), chojang haebeop (醋醬蟹法, made with soy sauce and vinegar), yeomtang haebeop (鹽湯蟹法, made with boiled salted water) as well as methods of rearing crabs are called Yukseon chibeop (肉膳治法). Therefore, the record verifies that the consumption of gejang in Korean diet appeared at least as early as the 17th century.

Crabs and harvest

According to Korean traditional medicine, crab has a cold nature that could cool one's body temperature, so gejang is believed to be good for driving away the spring fever. Although gejang was originally made with freshwater crabs in general, such crabs are becoming scarce, so the gejang made with kkotge (horse crab) caught in the Yellow Sea (West Sea), the west side of Korean peninsula, has become prevalent. Among gejang made with freshwater crabs, chamgejang of North Gyeongsang Province, which can be preserved and eaten after one year passes and beotteok gejang, which can be eaten immediately after preparation, are the most famous.

Preparation
To prepare ganjang-gejang, crabs are first thoroughly cleaned using a brush while submerged in a bowl of water, and are then rinsed to remove the moisture. The crabs are put in a hangari (earthenware crock) and are salted for about six hours. To prepare the sauce, a mixture of ganjang is boiled briefly along with sesame oil, sugar, finely sliced scallions, minced garlic, ginger, and finely shredded fresh red chili pepper. Once the salted crabs are removed from the hangari and placed in a suitable bowl, the hot sauce is poured onto the crabs. An hour later, the ganjang is removed from the bowl and reheated until boiling. It is again poured over the crabs, and the procedure is repeated for a third and fourth time. The dish can be eaten once the sauce is chilled. If using boiled ganjang after it has been chilled, the gejang can be eaten two weeks after preparation, and it can be preserved for longer. A variation involves adding minced beef while the sauce is poured over the crabs, endowing the gejang with more spices. In recent days, some people add lemon, chili pepper, or traditional medicine when making gejang in order to remove the fishy smell and to increase its rich flavor.

As for yangnyeom gejang, the dish is made with raw crabs and a spicy and sweet sauce of chili pepper powder, and ground Korean pear, onions, ginger and garlic, as well as whole sesame seeds, and sesame oil. In general, the gejang can be eaten a half day after the preparation and consuming the dish within two or three days is best to have its intact spicy and sweet and sour taste. If crabs are first marinated in a boiled and chilled mixture of eakjeok (액젓, filtered jeotgal) and soy sauce before mixing the spicy sauce, the yangnyeom gejang can be well marinated with the latter sauce, and can be preserved longer.

Types

Types are divided by crab species, region, and cooking method. Among varieties, beoltteok gejang (벌떡게장) is a local specialty of Jeolla Province and is made with live Charybdis, which are called either beoltteokge (벌떡게) or minkkotge (민꽃게) in Korean. The crab has a hard carapace with a reddish-brown color and is found in the seawater of Korea according to Jasaneobo (자산어보 "Fishes of the Huksan Island"), the first Korean fisheries science book written by the scholar Jeong Yak-jeon (정약전) in 1814. To make the gejang, the crabs are cut into several pieces or used whole if they are not large. One or two days after the beoltteokge have been marinated in a ganjang-based sauce, one can enjoy the gejang which has a fresh and sweet taste. However, beoltteok gejang can not be preserved for a long time, so it is said that the name reflects the fact; beotteok means "quickly" or "immediately" in Korean.

Kkotgejang (꽃게장) is made with kkotge (horse crab), which is the most consumed crab in South Korea. It is also a local specialty of Jeolla Province, and the dish is known for the umami taste. After cleaned, the live crabs are chopped into several pieces, and a mixture of ganjang, sliced scallions, garlic, ginger, chili pepper powder, sesame seeds, salted is poured over them. It can be eaten one day after preparation.

Another local speciality of Jeolla Province is konggejeot (콩게젓) which is indigenous to Gangjin County. The gejeng is made by grinding crabs as small as a bean (kong in Korean) with millstones. The thick ground paste is mixed with salt and gochujang. In Jeju Island, gejang is called gingijeot (깅이젓) made on every fifteenth of March in the lunar calendar at low tide. It is traditionally said that gingijeot is good to cure every illness in the region. 

Chamgejang (참게장) is a local specialty of Gyeonggi Province and is made with chamge (Chinese mitten crab) which generally live in the rivers of Korea which flow to the Yellow Sea. Chamge harvested in the Imjin River near the Paju region is especially famous for its unique taste and having a less earthy smell, so for many centuries the crabs were presented to the King of Korea as a delicacy. As demonstrated by the fact that records on chamge can be found in several historical documents regarding fisheries and cuisine such as Jasaneobo, Gyuhap chongseo (Women's Encyclopedia), and the chapter Jeoneoji (전어지) of Imwon gyeongjeji (임원경제지), the dish has been eaten by Koreans for a long time. However, these days pollution in the rivers has decreased the crab's habitat, so chamge is barely found except in Imjin River. Chamgejang is commonly nicknamed "bapdoduk' (밥도둑, literally "a meal thief" or "a rice thief") because it is considered a good dish for arousing one's appetite. The dish is intended to preserve for long periods, so the gejang is saltier than other varieties.

Chamgejang is also widely eaten in Gyeongsang Province, and is prepared at every house during autumn to make a banchan (small side dish) for the next summer. The crabs are also caught in rice fields during the harvest season, and female crabs are considered the best because they contain a lot of roe and fatty tomalley.

Serving

Yeosu is famous for gejang as well as gat kimchi (갓김치). A meal emphasizing ganjang-gejang is called gejang baekban (게장백반) that consists of a plate ganjang-gejang, various plates of banchan (side dishes), and a bowl of cooked rice.

See also

Jeotgal, salted fermented seafood
Jangajji, salted pickled vegetables
Banchan, small side dishes
Korean cuisine
 List of crab dishes
 List of seafood dishes

References

External links

 군산 계곡가든 꽃게장 at The Hankyoreh
 참을 수 없는 꽃게장의 유혹 at Hankook Ilbo
 Recipe at Patzzi
 Yangnyeom gejang recipe at Patzzi

Jeotgal
Crab dishes
Korean cuisine
Animal-based fermented foods